The Greatest Hits is the fourth greatest hits compilation by Australian singer songwriter Russell Morris. The album was released in June 2008.

It was released to coincide with the announcement of Morris' induction into the ARIA Hall of Fame in 2008.
The track listing is exactly the same as his 1978 compilation, Retrospective.

Track listing
 CD/ DD (2286952)
 "Hide & Seek" credited to Somebody's Image  (Doug Trevor, Martin Van Wyk) - 1:58
 "The Real Thing" (Johnny Young) - 6:12
 "Part Three into Paper Walls" (Russell Morris, Johnny Young) - 7:00
 "It's Only a Matter of Time" (Hans Poulsen) - 2:58
 "The Girl That I Love" (Johnny Young) - 4:36
 "You On My Mind" - (Hans Poulsen) - 2:28
 "Boom Town" (Russell Morris) - 3:18
 "Rachel" (Raymond Froggatt) - 4:27
 "Mr America" (Russell Morris) - 3:43
 "Sweet, Sweet Love" (Russell Morris) - 4:19
 "Live With Friends" (Russell Morris, Brian Cadd) - 3:39
 "O Helly" - (Russell Morris) - 2:41
 Jail Jonah's Daughter" - (Russell Morris) - 3:03
 "Alcohol Farm" (Russell Morris) - 3:20
 "Wings of an Eagle" (Russell Morris) - 3:57

References

2008 greatest hits albums
Russell Morris albums
Compilation albums by Australian artists
EMI Records compilation albums
Albums produced by Peter Dawkins (musician)